Carposina viduana is a moth in the Carposinidae family. It was described by Aristide Caradja in 1916. It is found in Russia (Khabarovskii krai, Primorskii krai).

The wingspan is 15–19 mm. The basal part, costal margin and distal third of the forewings are almost black. The pattern consists of five small concolorous costal spots and a large white trapezoidal spot and a black dot on the anal fold.

Taxonomy
This species was considered a form of Carposina sasakii by Alexey Diakonoff in 1989, but reinstated as a species in 2009.

References

Natural History Museum Lepidoptera generic names catalog

Carposinidae
Moths described in 1916
Moths of Asia
Taxa named by Aristide Caradja